Fernando Gomes Leitão (born 3 January 1981) is a Brazilian born Portuguese futsal player who plays for FC Litija and the Portugal national team as a pivot.

Honours
 Portuguese Futsal First Division: 2010–11, 2012–13
 Taça de Portugal de Futsal: 2010–11, 2012–13
 Portuguese Futsal Supercup: 2010–11

References

External links

1981 births
Living people
Portuguese men's futsal players
Brazilian men's futsal players
Minas Tênis Clube players
Sporting CP futsal players
Santiago Futsal players
Marca Futsal players